Stigmella pamirbetulae is a moth of the family Nepticulidae. It was described by Puplesis & Diškus in 2003. It is known from Tajikistan.

The larvae feed on Betula turkestanica. They probably mine the leaves of their host plant.

References

Nepticulidae
Moths of Asia
Moths described in 2003